The Keres people are one of the Pueblo peoples.  They speak English, Keresan languages, and in one pueblo Keresan Sign Language.

The seven Keres pueblos are:

 Cochiti Pueblo or Kotyit ("Forgotten"); Cochiti Pueblo people: Kʾúutìimʾé ("People from the Mountains, i.e. Cochiti people")
 San Felipe Pueblo or Katishtya (People down by the river ”The place where the White Shells are”)
 Kewa Pueblo (previously Santo Domingo) or Díiwʾi; Kewa Pueblo people: Dîiwʾamʾé 
 Zia Pueblo or Tsi'ya (Tsia) ("Sun Symbol"); Zia Pueblo people: Tsʾíiyʾamʾé
 Santa Ana Pueblo or Tamaiya (Dámáyá); Santa Ana Pueblo people: Dámáyámʾé (sing.) or Dámáyàamʾèetrạ (pl.)
 Acoma Pueblo or Aak'u (Áakʾuʾé or Haak'u) ("Place That Always Was", better known as "Sky City"); Acoma Pueblo people: Áakʾùumʾé (″Acoma People")
 Laguna Pueblo or Kawaika (Kawaik) ("Small Lake"); Laguna Pueblo people: Kʾáwáigamʾé ("People at/from the Small Lake")

The western pueblos, Acoma and Laguna, are the largest by area.

Ethnobotany
Abronia fragrans – The Keres people mix ground roots of the plant with corn flour, and eat to gain weight. They  also use this mixture to keep from becoming greedy, and they make ceremonial necklaces from the plant.
Acer negundo – Twigs are made into prayer sticks.
Commelina dianthifolia – Infusion of plant used as a strengthener for weakened tuberculosis patients.
Geranium caespitosum – Roots crushed into a paste to treat sores, and whole plant as turkey food.

References

Native American tribes
Puebloan peoples